La Esmeralda is a beach town and seaside locality in Uruguay, Rocha Department.

History 
The story of the area began with afforestation of sand dunes in 1949. Then, in the 1970s, the owners of the afforested areas, seeing its potential in tourist business, divided the land in solares (undeveloped plots) intended for the construction of summer homes.

Although this is still an unspoilt resort, in recent years there has been a gradual but steady increase in tourist business development. In last years, the construction of a casino and five-star hotel is planned.

Geography 

La Esmeralda is situated in La Angostura, isthmus of only 3000 meters wide, between the Laguna Negra and the South Atlantic Ocean on Rocha Department Wetlands, area declared a Biosphere Reserve by UNESCO in 1976. Just a few kilometres from the seaside locality are important tourist spots like La Pedrera, Valizas, Cabo Polonio, Punta del Diablo, the Fortaleza de Santa Teresa, La Coronilla, the Fuerte de San Miguel and the city of Chuy.

The topography is slightly undulating, allowing an excellent view of the ocean. It is densely forested with pines, eucalyptus and acacia, which enabled dune fixation.

Climate 
La Esmeralda is in the Southern Hemisphere’s temperate zone and has four seasons. Temperatures average 21°C to 27°C (70°F to 80°F) in summer and 10°C and 16°C (50°F to 60°F) in winter.

Population 
In 2011 La Esmeralda had a population of 57 permanent inhabitants and 240 dwellings, a figure that has been increasing year by year. No census results have been given for previous years. During the summer season the number or residents is increased significantly due to tourism.
 
Source: Instituto Nacional de Estadística de Uruguay

In the town are a police station, a fire department, accommodations for visitors, a restaurant and several shops.

References

External links 
 La Esmeralda - 2010 Summer - YouTube
 La Esmeralda - Tourism in Rocha - Government Website (in Spanish)

Populated places in the Rocha Department
Seaside resorts in Uruguay